Yoshimuriella is a genus of foliose (leafy) lichens in the family Peltigeraceae. It has nine species.

Taxonomy
The genus was circumscribed by lichenologists Bibiana Moncada and Robert Lücking in 2013, with Yoshimuriella fendleri assigned as the type species. The genus contains species that were previously considered part of the Lobaria peltigera species group, a clade of predominantly neotropical lichens. The genus name honours Japanese botanist and lichenologist Isao Yoshimura for his contributions to the understanding of the genus Lobaria and allied species. Seven species were included in the original circumscription of the genus.

Description
Yoshimuriella consists of foliose lichens that typically grows as epiphytes, and less frequently on logs or mossy rocks. They are green when wet, drying out to a pale greyish colour, and becoming pale yellowish after lengthy storage in a herbarium. Pseudocyphellae (pores for air exchange) and soredia are absent; isidia or phyllidia and lobules are often present, and are usually found at the margins of the lobes. The apothecia are cup-shaped and lecanorine in form. The photobiont partner is the green algal genus Dictyochloropsis. Secondary compounds that occur in Yoshimuriella include pseudocyphellarin A, gyrophoric acid, and congyrophoric acid.

Species
, Species Fungorum (in the Catalogue of Life) accepts eight species of Yoshimuriella; this total does not yet include a ninth species that was added to the genus in 2021. They are shown in this list, followed by their author citation, year of transfer into Yoshimuriella, and location where the type specimen was collected.
Yoshimuriella carassensis  – Brazil
Yoshimuriella corrosa  – Peru
Yoshimuriella denudata  – Colombia
Yoshimuriella deplanata  – Colombia
Yoshimuriella dissecta  – Jamaica
Yoshimuriella fendleri  – Venezuela
Yoshimuriella peltigera  – Brazil
Yoshimuriella subcorrosa  – Mexico
Yoshimuriella subdissecta  – Bolivia

References

Peltigerales
Peltigerales genera
Lichen genera
Taxa described in 2013
Taxa named by Robert Lücking